Bore Kutić (born 1955) is a politician in Serbia. He served in the National Assembly of Serbia from 2004 to 2007 and in the Assembly of Vojvodina from 2008 to 2020. Initially a member of the far-right Serbian Radical Party, he joined the Serbian Progressive Party on its formation in 2008.

Private career
Kutić is a lawyer and criminologist. He is from Nadalj, in the municipality of Srbobran.

Politician

Member of the National Assembly
Kutić was given the 104th position on the Radical Party's electoral list in the 2003 Serbian parliamentary election. The party won eighty-two mandates, and Kutić was subsequently selected for its assembly delegation. (From 2000 to 2011, mandates in Serbian assembly elections were awarded to parties or coalitions rather than individual candidates, and it was common practice for the mandates to be assigned out of numerical order. Kutić's list position had no formal bearing on whether or not he received a mandate.) The Radical Party emerged from the election with the largest number of seats, but it fell well short of a majority and ultimately served in opposition. Kutić served as a Radical Party parliamentarian for the next three years.

Kutić also appeared on the Radical Party's lists in the 2007 and 2008 parliamentary elections, although he was not selected for a mandate on either occasion.

Provincial politics
Kutić sought election to the Vojvodina assembly in the 2004 provincial election, running in the Srbobran constituency seat. He was defeated in the second round of voting. (During this period, half of the seats in the Vojvodina assembly were determined by proportional representation and the other half by elections in single-member constituencies.)

He received the forty-eighth position on the Radical Party's electoral list in the 2008 provincial election. The list won twenty seats, and he was selected for a  mandate. The Democratic Party and its allies won the election, and the Radicals again served in opposition.

The Radical Party experienced a serious split later in 2008, with several members joining the more moderate Progressive Party under the leadership of Tomislav Nikolić and Aleksandar Vučić. Kutić sided with the Progressives and was a founding member of their parliamentary group in the assembly.

Serbia's electoral system was reformed in 2011, such that mandates were awarded in numerical order to candidates on successful lists. Kutić was given the fourth position on the Progressive Party's list in the 2012 provincial election and was re-elected when the list won fourteen mandates. The election won again won the by the Democratic Party, and Kutić remained an opposition member for the next four years.

Vojvodina switched to a system of full proportional representation prior to the 2016 provincial election. Kutić was given the twenty-first position on the Progressive list and was elected to a third term when the list won a majority victory with sixty-three out of 120 mandates. After the election, he was appointed as chair of the committee for co-operation with the committees on the national assembly in exercising the competencies of the province. He subsequently chaired the committee for inter-communal relations in Vojvodina. He did not seek re-election in 2020.

Municipal politics
Kutić has also been active in the municipal politics of Srbobran. He was the Radical Party's candidate for mayor of the municipality in the 2004 Serbian local elections and was defeated by independent candidate Branko Gajin in the second round. (This was the only electoral cycle since 1990 in which mayors of Serbian cities and municipalities were directly elected.)

He subsequently appeared in the lead position on the Radical Party's list for the municipal assembly in the 2008 local elections, although he did not claim a mandate afterwards. He received the third position on the Progressive Party's list in the 2012 local elections and was elected when the list won four mandates. He resigned his mandate on 23 August 2012.

Electoral record

Assembly of Vojvodina

Municipality of Srbobran

References

1955 births
Living people
People from Srbobran
Members of the National Assembly (Serbia)
Members of the Assembly of Vojvodina
Serbian Radical Party politicians
Serbian Progressive Party politicians